"By the Beautiful Sea" is a popular song published in 1914, with music written by Harry Carroll and lyrics written by Harold R. Atteridge. The melody was composed on the terrace of Reisenweber's Brighton Beach Casino. The sheet music was published by Shapiro, Bernstein & Co.

The song was originally recorded by the Heidelberg Quintet, topping the early American music charts for six weeks in the summer of 1914, during the outbreak of World War I. Other popular recordings in 1914 were by Ada Jones & Billy Watkins, and by Prince's Orchestra.

See also 
 List of best-selling sheet music

References

External links
 
 A 1914 recording of the song by the Victor Military Band

Songs about oceans and seas
Songs with music by Harry Carroll
1914 songs
1910s song stubs
Songs with lyrics by Harold R. Atteridge